KAZZ (1400 AM) is a radio station broadcasting a sports format. Licensed to Parowan, Utah, United States, the station is currently owned by M. Kent Frandsen, through licensee Canyon Media Group, Inc.

Translator
KAZZ serves the Cedar City - St. George, Utah radio market and rebroadcasts on FM translator station K226CM 93.1 MHz, licensed to Cedar City, Utah.

History
The station began broadcasting in October 2004, carrying the adult standards format of Dial Global Networks and CNN Radio News from Westwood One. The call sign KENT was assigned in May 2004

On May 29, 2009, the Fifth District Court of Utah in Washington County, UT appointed a receiver to take over KENT for US Capital, Incorporated of Boulder CO, an investment group that foreclosed on Legacy Media, the owners of KENT and several other stations. The station was sold to M. Kent Frandsen of Logan, UT for $12,000 in a court-approved sale. The transaction, through Frandsen's Canyon Media Group, Inc., was consummated on May 31, 2013. The station changed its call sign to KAZZ on November 27, 2014.

On August 4, 2021 KAZZ changed their format from adult standards to sports, branded as "Fox Sports Southern Utah", with programming from Fox Sports Radio.

On December 5, 2022, Fox Sports Radio programming was removed from the station and moved to KXFF.

References

External links

AZZ
Parowan, Utah
Sports radio stations in the United States
Fox Sports Radio stations